Elena Vladimirovna Roslyakova (8 July 1987) is a Russian model. She has appeared on more than 400 magazine covers, including Elle and Vogue. She has been called by Vogue Paris one of the best models of the 2000s decade and one of the most influential Russian models of all time, alongside Natalia Vodianova and Natasha Poly.

Biography

She was born in Omsk, Russia.

During her second season on the runways (Fall/Winter 2005) Roslyakova walked in 78 shows during the ready-to-wear season in all the major fashion capitals, and during the Fall/Winter 2006 runway season Roslyakova walked 86 shows (only including NYC, London, Paris, and Milan) which is the highest number of shows walked in one season by any model to date. Vlada belongs in the "Wide Eyed Doll" era of models, along with models Sasha Pivovarova, Jessica Stam, Lily Cole, and Gemma Ward. She has been featured in advertising campaigns for Nina Ricci, Moschino, Hermès, MaxMara, Christian Lacroix, Dolce & Gabbana, Jill Stuart Beauty, DKNY, Daks Japan, Gap, Barney's, Anna Sui, Etro, Cartier, Sonia Rykiel, Belstaff, Hobbs, Alcacuz, Swarovski, Diamond Dazzle, Derercuny, Karl Lagerfeld and Lacoste. She has also appeared in lookbooks for Prada, Gucci, Versace, Donna Karan, Lanvin, Ralph Lauren, Alberta Ferretti, and many more.

Her runway credits include top fashion houses and designers like Alberta Ferretti, Alexander McQueen, Balenciaga, Blumarine, Bottega Veneta, Burberry Prorsum, Calvin Klein, Céline, Chanel, Chloé, Christian Dior, Comme des Garçons, Dolce & Gabbana, DSquared², Emanuel Ungaro, Emilio Pucci, Etro, Fendi, Gianfranco Ferré, Giorgio Armani, Givenchy, Gucci, Hermès, Jean Paul Gaultier, Jil Sander, Kenzo, Lanvin, Loewe, Louis Vuitton, MaxMara, Missoni, Miu Miu, Moschino, Mugler, Nina Ricci, Prada, Roberto Cavalli, Salvatore Ferragamo, Sonia Rykiel, Stella McCartney, Valentino, Versace, Viktor & Rolf, Yohji Yamamoto and Yves Saint Laurent.

In 2020, Roslyakova appeared in the Badgely Mischka Spring-Summer campaign and also in the Desigual Campaign collaboration with Christian Lacroix.

Vogue Paris declared her one of the top 30 models of the 2000s.

Roslyakova speaks Russian, English, and French. She currently lives in New York City.

References

External links

Vlada Roslyakova on style.com

1987 births
Living people
Female models from Omsk
Russian emigrants to the United States
Women Management models